Evonne is a given name, an English respelling of Yvonne. Well-known women named Evonne include:

 Evonne Goolagong, one of the world's leading women's tennis players in the 1970s and early-1980s
 Evonne Hsu, Taiwanese pop singer

See also
Evin (disambiguation)
Evan
Even (disambiguation)
Evon (given name)
Yvon (disambiguation)
Ivon